Amador Vieira, best known as Rei Amador, was a member of the king of the Angolars and leader of a famous slave rebellion that took place in 1595 in the African islands of São Tomé and Príncipe.  According to some historic documents, Rei Emadir was "a slave" who avoided slavery and mobilized all the Angolares along with other Africans and made a free nation under the middle of the aforementioned islands.

History of the Origin of the Angolars
The Angolars inhabited the south of the island of São Tomé. It is not known for certain how they originally came to dwell on the island; there are at least three competing explanations.

The first story on the origin of the Angolars is that they were African slaves taken from the mainland, likely Angola, and survived a shipwreck about 2–3 miles (4 km) off the south coast of São Tomé Island. Another version is that the Angolars were African slaves who evaded their owners around 1470, when the Portuguese discovered the islands of São Tomé and Príncipe. They created their own free nation within the islands called Kilombo or Quilombo. The name Kilombo or Quilombo derives from Kimbundu (one of the most spoken languages in Angola), it can mean a settlement kingdom, population and union. Kilombo was an independent nation made by African slaves, who fought against slavery and once they fled, built their independent state. The Kilombos, in general were localized in its regions densely forested, far from the plantations. A third version was that the Angolars were Africans who immigrated from the mainland to the islands of São Tomé and Príncipe, long before the arrivals of the Portuguese into the islands.

Whatever their origin, the story of the Angolars and their reign in São Tomé and Príncipe is part of a history of self-determination and independence carried out by Rei Amador.

Slave rebellion
On 9 July 1595, Rei Amador, and his people, the Angolars, allied with other enslaved Africans of its plantations, marched into the interior woods and battled against the Portuguese. It is said that day, Rei Amador and his followers raised a flag in front of the settlers and proclaimed Rei Amador as king of São Tomé and Príncipe, making himself as "Rei Amador, liberator of all the black people".

Between 1595 and 1596, the island of São Tomé was ruled by the Angolars, under the command of Rei Amador. On 4 January 1596, he was captured, sent to prison and was later executed by the Portuguese. Still today, they remember him fondly and consider him a national hero of the islands.

Legacy
In São Tomé and Príncipe, January 4 was declared a holiday in his honour, first celebrated in 2005.
A football (soccer) club known as UDRA is named after him.
Rei Amador was depicted in a 5,000 dobras note. Also all notes bear the portrait of Rei Amador on the obverse until late 2017. It is a contemporary creation attributed by the painter Pinásio Pina as there is no actual portraits of Rei Amador. Rei Amador was also featured in bank notes of Cape Verde.
In 2004 during the International Year on the Battle Against Slavery and its Abolition, UN Secretary General Kofi Annan erected a statue of Rei Amador in São Tomé and Príncipe.

References

Further reading
 Izequiel Batista de Sousa, São Tomé et Principe de 1485 à 1755 : une société coloniale : du Blanc au Noir, L'Harmattan, Paris, 2008, 374 p.  (texte remanié d'une thèse de doctorat d'Histoire soutenue à l'Université de Paris 1 en 1998) 
 Fernando de Macedo, Teatro do imaginário angolar de S. Tomé e Príncipe, Cena Lusófona, Coimbra, 2000, 142 p.

External links
 « Le 'Roi Amador' de São Tome, précurseur de l’abolitionnisme africain » (article bt  Popo Klah in Afrocentricité (Afrocentricity)) 
A Verdadeira Origem do Célebre Rei Amador, Leader of a Slave Rebellion in 1595'' Gerhard Seibert of Espaço Cultural STP, article in  PIÁ, no..26, January 2005 

History of São Tomé and Príncipe
People from São Tomé
Rebel slaves
1596 deaths